Sintez is a Russian professional water polo club from Kazan, Russia. The club was formed in 1974 and plays in Russia's highest division since 1993. Former Russian centar forward Andrey Belofastov is head coach.

Accomplishments 
 Russian Water Polo Championship 
  (4) — 2006-07, 2019-20, 2020-21, 2021-22;
  (8) — 2005-06, 2007–08, 2009–10, 2011-12, 2012-13, 2013-14, 2015-16, 2016-17;
  (4) — 2004-05, 2009-09, 2010–11, 2017-18;
 Russian Cup
  (4) — 2005, 2010, 2021, 2022;
 LEN Cup
  (1) — 2006-07;
  (2) — 2005-06, 2015-16;

Prominent players 
 Andrey Belofastov — 2004–09;
 Irek Zinnourov — 2004–09;
 Marat Zakirov — 2005–10;
 Nikolay Maksimov — 2005–11;
 Dejan Savić  — 2005–10;
 Danilo Ikodinović  — 2006–08.

External links 
 Official site

Water polo clubs in Russia
Sport in Kazan